Playlist: The Very Best of Brooks & Dunn is a 2008 compilation album by Brooks & Dunn. It is part of a series of similar Playlist albums issued by Sony BMG, the parent company of Brooks & Dunn's label, Arista Nashville. The album features 10 of Brooks & Dunn's singles. "Best of My Love" was originally included on Common Thread: The Songs of the Eagles, "Against the Wind" on the King of the Hill soundtrack and "I Ain't Living Long Like This" on I've Always Been Crazy: A Tribute to Waylon Jennings, while "The Fightin' Side of Me" was previously unissued. "Only in America" is a live performance from Farm Aid 2003.

Critical reception
Playlist: The Very Best of Brooks & Dunn received three out of five stars from InMusic. The author wrote that "this greatest hits compilation is filled with the Brooks & Dunn tracks that have made the country duo a staple among new country enthusiasts."

Commercial performance
Playlist: The Very Best of Brooks & Dunn peaked at No. 48 on the U.S. Billboard Top Country Albums chart the week of January 24, 2009.

Track listing

Charts

References

External links
[ Playlist: The Very Best of Brooks & Dunn] at Allmusic

2008 compilation albums
Brooks & Dunn albums
Arista Records compilation albums
Brooks and Dunn